The Tiangong censer (Chinese: 天公爐, tian gong lu) is a special type of incense burner used for worshiping the Jade Emperor. "Because he is the highest-ranking deity in the deity world, most of the people in Taiwan do not make statues of the deity, but instead use the deity as a representative. When it comes to the shape of censers, people usually think of round tripods with three legs. However, there are also square ones. The design of the censer typically features two dragons grabbing pearls, with patterns of dragons rising or descending on the censer's ears. In the past, most censers were made of stone or iron. Nowadays, it's rare to find large metal censers from before the Japanese rule, as many have been melted down and reused..

Classification 
The form of the Tiangong censer may vary depending on the region or location, and is adjusted according to Customs and other factors.

Domestic 

 Hoklo Taiwanese people hang a censer called Tiangong in the middle of the hall beam in Taiwan. The censer is hung with four chains, which are suspended from the sky and the earth. The four heavenly ministers are in charge of the four directions and seasons.
  changed the number of chains from four to three to symbolize inviting the Three Great Emperor-Officials, who are in charge of the three realms of heaven, earth, and water, to pay respect to the Jade Emperor. This is because they believe that only kings could authorize temples to offer sacrifice to heaven in ancient times. The censer used is sometimes called the "Three Realm Furnace" or "Three Realm Gong Furnace".
 Taiwan Hakka's Tiangong censer is also known as wall Buddha, sky worship, and Tiangong Pagoda. The incense burner is usually placed on the inside left side of the door or in the recess of the wall pillar, and the words "Jade Emperor's Divine Position" or "Heavenly God's Blessing Incense Position" are written on red paper. It is also said that the Hakka people also called the Tiangong censer as "Sun Gong" or "Sun God", which is a metaphor for "Anti-Qing sentiment". "Since the Hakka ancestors regarded themselves as a Central Plains scholar and considered the Qing dynasty Manchus as a foreign nationality, they placed the Tiangong censer outdoors and worshipped the Sun God in the name of worshipping the Ming dynasty as Han Chinese.

 Matsu people who worship gods and ancestors in their homes will put incense burners in front of their doors to worship the gods of heaven. The location is on the left hand side of the doorway, that is, the dragon side of the main door of the residence (dragon side is large) Some shapes also reflect the occupation of the owner, such as fish-shaped incense burners representing fishermen and scroll-shaped incense burners representing public educators; generally, clean iron cans wrapped in red paper are commonly used to nail the sides of the doors or decorated with paper-cut flowers. Before worshipping the gods (or ancestors), incense should be offered to the gods (or ancestors) in order.

In addition, in general, families mainly worship the family gods, so they do not set up a four-legged floor standing censer at home. According to folklore, if you set up such a censer in your home, you are setting up a palace altar for fear of attracting Goryō to your home to seek justice.

Temples 
The location and size of the Tiangong censer be changed depending on the building, such as in the courtyard or in front of the pavilion outside the temple, but there are still several common points in their setup.

 The Tiangong censer must be set up with the sky in view.
 The censer has three feet, symbolizing the triad of Tiger, Horse, and Dog, i.e., the triad of heaven, earth, and man.
 Most of the three feet are placed with two feet facing inward and one foot facing outward. see image for demonstration

References

Taiwanese folk religion
East Asian folk religion
Traditional rituals of East Asia
Religious Confucianism
Religious objects